Mediochoerus is an extinct genus of oreodont of the family Merycoidodontidae, subfamily Merycoidodontinae, endemic to North America during the Early Miocene-Middle Miocene subepochs (20.6—13.6 mya), existing for approximately .

Taxonomy
Mediochoerus was named by Schultz and Falkenbach (1941) and assigned to Merycoidodontidae by Schultz and Falkenbach (1941) and Lander (1998).

Fossil distribution
Nebraska and California.

Species
M. blicki (type species), M. johnsoni, M. mohavensis

References

Oreodonts
Miocene mammals of North America
Miocene even-toed ungulates
Serravallian extinctions
Prehistoric even-toed ungulate genera